The Suzhou East railway station is a high-speed railway station in Suzhou, Anhui, People's Republic of China. It is served by the Jinghu High-Speed Railway.

This station (or any station in Suzhou, Anhui) should not be confused with any of the railway stations in Suzhou, Jiangsu, hundreds of miles away. The "su" syllable in the names of the two cities are written with different Chinese characters ( vs. ), but are romanized identically.

Railway stations in Anhui
Railway stations in China opened in 2010